Aline may refer to these footballers:

Aline (footballer, born 1982) (Aline Pellegrino), Brazilian defender
Aline (footballer, born 1989) (Aline Reis), Brazilian goalkeeper